Lektz is an eBook business platform developed by AEL Data, operating in the UK and India. The platform has DRM, ebook reader applications, virtual book store, ebook conversion, elending, consumer analytics, and digital marketing solutions for small, medium-sized publishers and independent authors. Dr M.S. Mohammed Sadiq, Sr. Vice President of AEL Data, is the chief architect of the Lektz platform and it draws support from AEL Data's ePublishing, digitization, accessibility solutions, and application development services.

The Lektz platform was presented as an ebook ecosystem at the London Book Fair 2013, by Dr Sadiq and Lindsay MacLeod, Executive Director at AEL Data.

Lektz eBook Reader is a reader application for Android, iOS devices, and PC reader (web-based/Google Chrome Extension).It supports PDF, EPUB2 and EPUB3 ebook formats. It was launched by AEL Data Services in May 2012. The Lektz reader provides full support to Non-DRM ebooks while the DRM support is limited to ebooks that are secured using the Lektz Proprietary DRM. The Lektz eBook Reader supports both Fixed Layout and Freeflow EPUB across varied platforms.

Use
The Lektz SaaS based solution is where publishers sign up and create their own branded ebook stores, upload PDF and EPUB ebooks to it, encrypt them using Lektz DRM, configure their own payment gateway and start selling their ebooks on the Lektz platform. The on-premises solution is where the ebookstore, elending, DRM and payment gateway solutions are integrated into a publisher website.

DRM
Lektz DRM is a proprietary eBook DRM technology of AEL Data. Lektz DRM secures eBooks from being copied and transmitted without appropriate rights and permissions. When publishers upload their eBooks in the Lektz platform, they can choose to enable DRM security for their eBooks which is decrypted when synced with the Lektz reader.

There are three levels of protection:
 eBook encryption
 eBook accessing device control
 User account credentials verification

The Lektz DRM mechanism is designed as a closed system and is implemented by protecting the eBooks with the system software, which also acts as an eBook reader (Lektz reader). To secure the eBooks, all the eBooks that are sold via the publisher's website are embedded with a security mechanism, and will only be permitted to open using Lektz e-reader software. Lektz DRM can be integrated with publishers existing websites or portals to secure their eBooks from piracy and to provide a secured platform to sell and distribute their books online.

Ebook reader
Lektz eBook Reader is a reader application for Android, iOS and PC (stand-alone and Google Chrome Extension). It supports PDF, EPUB2 and EPUB3 ebook formats. It was launched by AEL Data Services in May 2012. The Lektz reader provides full support to Non-DRM ebooks while the DRM support is limited to ebooks that are secured using the Lektz Proprietary DRM. The Lektz eBook Reader supports freeflow EPUB across varied platforms.

An exclusive variant of the Lektz reader is Al-Lektz, which is developed distinctively for Middle-East and North African ebook users. It has a default RTL (Right to Left) orientation and Arabic compatible user interface.

Dyslektz eBook reader was launched during the first week of June 2013 on Google Play and the Apple App Store. This reader is intended to enable users with dyslexia to read ebooks on their smartphones and tablets. Any ebook imported into the Dyslektz Reader is converted into OpenDyslexic font which makes digital content more accessible to dyslexics.

Elending
The eLending solution developed by Lektz adds the online library functionality to a publisher's website where ebooks can be borrowed through a reader application for a periodic subscription. Lektz incorporates this component as a standalone as well as an integrated solution to a publisher's website.

Ebook store
The ebook store is one of the major components of the Lektz ebook business solution. Publishers can set up their own virtual e-book store in the Lektz platform to upload and manage their e-books and make them available for sale. It also provides a back-end content management system where the publishers can track and manage their sales and view consumer analytics.

References

EPUB readers
Android (operating system) software
IOS software
Digital rights management